Molly Thompson-Smith (born 7 November 1997) is a British rock climber and sport climber who regularly competes in climbing competitions. She is a five-time UK national lead climbing champion

She also provided commentary for two French IFSC World Cups and the Tokyo 2020 Olympics, and is aiming to qualify and participate in the 2024 Summer Olympics in Paris.

References

1997 births
Living people
Female climbers
British rock climbers